Krzemieniewo  is a village in the administrative district of Gmina Czarne, within Człuchów County, Pomeranian Voivodeship, in northern Poland.

The village has a population of 589. It has a church dating from 1629.

Krzemieniewo was the site of subcamp Krummensee of the Nazi Stutthof concentration camp near Danzig during the Third Reich.

References

Krzemieniewo
Holocaust locations in Poland

de:Krummensee